Jackson's Mill or Jackson Mill may refer to:

Jackson's Mill, a grist mill in West Virginia
Jackson Mills, New Jersey, an unincorporated community in Ocean County
Jackson Mill, West Virginia, an unincorporated community in Lewis County
Jackson's Mill Covered Bridge (disambiguation)
Jackson's Mill State 4-H Camp Historic District, in Lewis County, West Virginia